Malton GO Station is a train and bus station in the GO Transit network, located near Toronto Pearson International Airport, in the community of Malton in Mississauga, Ontario, Canada. It is a stop on the Kitchener line, and is a flag stop for Via Rail trains operating between Toronto, London and Sarnia.

History

The first station was a wood-frame structure built in 1856 by the Grand Trunk Railway (GTR), which was superseded by a second frame building in 1912. Ownership of the station was transferred to Canadian National Railway in 1920 when they acquired the GTR and they demolished that station in 1973.

GO Transit constructed a completely new building and platforms, south of Derry Road and east of Airport Road, for the introduction of GO Train service in 1974.

The International Limited was operated jointly by Via Rail and Amtrak between Chicago and Toronto. The service, which had started in 1982, was discontinued in 2004.

Metrolinx, the parent of GO Transit, purchased the  Weston Subdivision from Canadian National Railway in 2009, including this section of track. CN will continue to serve its freight customers in the area and VIA will operate trains on the line.

Recent station renovations included improvements such as new walkways and a tunnel for pedestrian access to new platforms which have canopies rather than shelters, and expansion of the parking lot. The previous basic brick building has also been replaced by a new structure which offers improved facilities. The addition of elevators has now made the station fully accessible.

Bus connections
 31 Guelph - Georgetown - Brampton - Toronto GO Bus intermediate stops between Guelph Central Station, Georgetown GO Station, Brampton GO Station and Union Station Bus Terminal
 38 Bolton GO Bus to Bolton
 30 Rexdale (MiWay)
 505 Züm Bovaird (Züm)

The local MiWay bus routes do not enter the station bus loop and can be boarded a short distance away at Derry Road, which consists of Routes 18 and 42.

The local Brampton Transit bus routes do not enter the station bus loop and can be boarded a short distance away at Derry Road, which consists of Route 14/A.

References

External links
 
VIA Rail Canada, Malton train station page

GO Transit railway stations
Railway stations in Mississauga
Railway stations in Canada opened in 1974
1974 establishments in Ontario
Former Amtrak stations in Canada